The 1972 United States presidential election in Oklahoma was held on November 7, 1972 as part of the 1972 United States presidential election. Voters chose eight electors, or representatives to the Electoral College, who voted for president and vice president.

Oklahoma voted in a landslide for incumbent Republican President Richard Nixon over his Democratic challenger George McGovern. Nixon's winning margin of 49.70 percentage points made Oklahoma his third-strongest state, behind Mississippi and Georgia, and 26.55 percentage points more Republican than the nation at-large. Although in the twenty-first century Oklahoma has rivaled Wyoming, Utah, Idaho and increasingly West Virginia as the most Republican state in the nation, no presidential candidate in Oklahoma has ever equaled Nixon's margin of victory. Indeed, in the eleven presidential elections since this one, only twice has any state been carried by a larger percentage margin – both by Ronald Reagan in Utah, as part of the 1980 and 1984 elections.

Nixon carried with over sixty percent of the vote all seventy-seven counties in the state, four years after he had won the Sooner State despite finishing behind both Democrat Hubert Humphrey and American Independent George Wallace in Love, McCurtain and Pushmataha Counties. American Independent John G. Schmitz was the only other candidate on the ballot, and he received 2.30 percent of the vote, although managing over eleven percent in the Panhandle county of Cimarron. Nixon's feat of winning every county in Oklahoma would not be achieved by a Republican again until George W. Bush in 2004 (since then, however, every county has stayed in the GOP column in presidential elections). This was the last time until 2004 that Hughes County and Haskell County voted Republican in a presidential election.

In archconservative Oklahoma, McGovern was uniformly viewed as a left-wing extremist because of his support for busing and civil rights, plus his opposition to the Vietnam War, support for granting amnesty to draft dodgers and support for a thousand-dollar giveaway to each American as a solution to poverty. Many, especially Republican campaigners, also believed McGovern would legalise abortion and illicit drugs if he were elected – despite the fact that his running mate Sargent Shriver was firmly anti-abortion.

Consequently, even the most loyal Southern Democrats from the southeastern part of the state almost completely deserted their traditional party for Nixon: Bryan, Choctaw, Coal, Johnston, and the above-mentioned Love and McCurtain Counties deserted their traditional Democratic Party for the first time ever. Nixon also almost completely captured the twenty percent of Oklahoman voters who had supported Wallace in 1968: exit polls suggested he won them over McGovern by a ratio of ten to one, and in the two Wallace counties of Pushmataha and Atoka Nixon totaled over seventy percent of the vote vis-à-vis less than thirty in 1968.

Results

Results by county

See also
 United States presidential elections in Oklahoma

References

1972
Oklahoma